The Hungarian Cross of Merit (Hungarian: Magyar Érdemkereszt) is the fifth highest State Order of Hungary. Until 2011, the order was awarded the called the Cross of Merit of the Republic of Hungary.

Classes 
The order comes in civil and military divisions, both of which are divided into three classes.

Insignia 

The order's insignia is composed of a 42mm diameter widening banded cross with a stylised laurel wreath between the stems (2mm). Its central field, also surrounded by a laurel wreath, bears the coat of arms of the Hungarian Republic of 1990 on the obverse and the years "1946/1991" on the reverse. The cross is plated in gold, silver or bronze according to the grade.

Sources 

 State Decorations, Office of the President of Hungary
 Hungary: Hungarian Order of Merit (Civilian), Medals of the World
 1991 XXXI law enacting the order

Orders, decorations, and medals of Hungary